Awaji Dam  is a gravity dam located in Kagawa Prefecture in Japan. The dam is used for flood control and water supply. The catchment area of the dam is 2.7 km2. The dam impounds about 6  ha of land when full and can store 780 thousand cubic meters of water. The construction of the dam was started on 1972 and completed in 1980.

See also 
List of dams in Japan

References 

Dams in Kagawa Prefecture